Suck My Shirt is the fourth studio album by American punk rock band The Coathangers. It was released on Suicide Squeeze Records on March 18, 2014, to generally favorable reviews. Mark Deming of AllMusic writes, 'their approach to songcraft has matured and tightened up quite a bit, and the departure of keyboard player Candice Jones has turned this group into a leaner and meaner three piece.'

Track listing

Personnel
Julia Kugel (Crook Kid Coathanger) – Guitar, vocals
Stephanie Luke (Rusty Coathanger) – Drums, vocals
Meredith Franco (Minnie Coathanger) – Bass guitar, vocals
Jenny – Photography
Justin McNeight – Engineer
Scott Montoya – Design, layout
Ed Rawls – Engineer
Ryan Russell – Back cover photo, cover photo
Roger Seibel – Mastering

References

Suicide Squeeze Records albums
The Coathangers albums
2014 albums